Pál Gömöry (23 April 1936 – 7 May 2021) was a Hungarian sailor. He competed in the Flying Dutchman event at the 1968 Summer Olympics.

References

External links
 

1936 births
2021 deaths
Hungarian male sailors (sport)
Olympic sailors of Hungary
Sailors at the 1968 Summer Olympics – Flying Dutchman
Sportspeople from Budapest